Inaudi is a surname of Italian origin. Notable people with the surname include:

 Francesca Inaudi (born 1977), Italian actress
 Jacques Inaudi (1867–1950), Italian mathematician 
 Nicolas Inaudi (born 1978), French cyclist

See also
 Einaudi

Italian-language surnames